The Union City Micropolitan Statistical Area, as defined by the United States Census Bureau, is an area consisting of Obion County, Tennessee; anchored by the city of Union City, Tennessee. As of the 2000 census, the μSA had a population of 32,450.

Demographics

As of the census of 2000, there were 40,202 people, 16,419 households, and 11,511 families residing within the μSA. The racial makeup of the μSA was 85.64% White, 12.42% African American, 0.13% Native American, 0.21% Asian, 0.04% Pacific Islander, 0.80% from other races, and 0.76% from two or more races. Hispanic or Latino of any race were 1.67% of the population.

The median income for a household in the μSA was $28,573, and the median income for a family was $35,661. Males had a median income of $29,682 versus $19,791 for females. The per capita income for the μSA was $15,859.

Combined Statistical Area
The Martin–Union City Combined Statistical Area is made up of two counties in northwest Tennessee. The statistical area includes two micropolitan areas. As of the 2010 Census, the CSA had a population of 65,541.

Counties
Obion County, Tennessee
Weakley County, Tennessee

Communities

Places with 10,000 to 15,000 inhabitants
Martin, Tennessee (Principal city)
Union City, Tennessee (Principal city)

Places with 1,000 to 10,000 inhabitants
Dresden, Tennessee
Gleason, Tennessee
Greenfield, Tennessee
Kenton, Tennessee (partial)
McKenzie, Tennessee (partial)
Obion, Tennessee
South Fulton, Tennessee
Troy, Tennessee

Places with less than 1,000 inhabitants
Hornbeak, Tennessee
Rives, Tennessee
Samburg, Tennessee
Sharon, Tennessee
Trimble, Tennessee (partial)
Woodland Mills, Tennessee

Micropolitan Statistical Areas (μSAs)
 Union City (Fulton County, Kentucky and Obion County, Tennessee)
 Martin (Weakley County, Tennessee)

See also
Tennessee census statistical areas

References